The Berliner-Joyce P-16 was a 1930s United States two-seat fighter aircraft produced by Berliner-Joyce Aircraft Corporation.

Design and development
The Berliner-Joyce Aircraft Corporation was established in February 1929 when it acquired the assets of the Berliner Aircraft Company. The new company had intended to develop the Berliner Monoplane but became involved in designing a two-seat fighter for the United States Army Air Corps. The prototype, designated the Berliner-Joyce XP-16 first flew in October 1929 (at this time in the United States, fighter aircraft were known as "pursuit planes", and were designated with a "P"; the "X" stands for "Experimental"). It had a metal structure with a fabric covering. It was a single-bay biplane of unequal span ("sesquiplane"), with the wings forward-staggered. The lower wing was smaller than the upper and was mounted at the base of the fuselage, and unusually, were of reverse-gullwing type, while the upper wing was of gull wing configuration.  An observer/gunner was located behind the pilot. The aircraft was powered by a 600 hp (447 kW) Curtiss V-1570 Conqueror supercharged V-12 inline engine. After evaluation by the USAAC two contracts were awarded for a total of 25 aircraft as YP-16s (the first 15 were considered preproduction, which were given a "Y" designation). The main difference with the production aircraft was the use of an unsupercharged version of the Conqueror engine, and a three-bladed propeller.

Operational history
During 1931, the USAAC ordered the Berliner-Joyce YP-16 which had the distinction of being the last biplane fighter to enter service with the USAAC. In addition, the P-16 remained the only two-seat biplane fighter to be produced for the army after 1918.

Delivered in 1932 as the Y1P-16 primarily equipping the 94th Pursuit Squadron, the production aircraft were later re-designated PB-1 (Pursuit-Biplace, an awkward designation for a class of aircraft and only applied to one other type, the Consolidated PB-30).  Without the prototype's supercharger, performance at altitude was appreciably reduced although the aircraft had a greater endurance than contemporary single-seat pursuits.  Despite the gull-wing, pilots had poor visibility over the nose which contributed to service pilots having a propensity to nose-over on landing.

All Berliner-Joyce PB-1s were withdrawn from active service in 1934, although a small number of aircraft continued in second line duties until 1940.

Variants
XP-16
Prototype with 600 hp Curtiss V-1570-25 engine, one built.
Y1P-16
Production version, became P-16 after evaluation, 25 built.
P-16
In-service designation of the 25 production aircraft, re-designated PB-1 in 1935.
PB-1
Production aircraft re-designated from P-16 in 1935.

Operators

United States Army Air Corps

Specifications (P-16)

See also

References

Citations

Bibliography
 Baugher, Joe. "Berliner-Joyce P-16/PB-1." American Military Aircraft, 7 June 1998. Retrieved: 10 June 2011.
 Dorr, Robert F. and David Donald. Fighters of the United States Air Force: From World War I Pursuits to the F-117. New York: Military Press, 1990. .
 The Illustrated Encyclopedia of Aircraft (Part Work 1982–1985). London: Orbis Publishing, 1985.

 Wagner, Ray. American Combat Planes. New York: Doubleday and Company, 1968. .
 Taylor, Michael J.H. Jane's Encyclopedia of Aviation. London: Studio Editions, 1989. .

External links

 Berliner-Joyce P-16/PB-1
 Berliner-Joyce
 "Pursuit Plane For Two Men Developed For The Army" ''Popular Mechanics, December 1932

Gull-wing aircraft
Berliner-Joyce P-16
P-16
Single-engined tractor aircraft
Aircraft first flown in 1930
Sesquiplanes